The twenty-first season of British science fiction television series Doctor Who began on 5 January 1984 with the Fifth Doctor (Peter Davison) serial Warriors of the Deep, and ended with Colin Baker's first serial The Twin Dilemma. For the third time (the first being during Season 4 and second being Season 18), the entire TARDIS crew changed over the course of a single season. John Nathan-Turner produced the series, with Eric Saward script editing.

Casting

Main cast 
 Peter Davison as the Fifth Doctor
 Janet Fielding as Tegan Jovanka
 Mark Strickson as Vislor Turlough
 Gerald Flood as Voice of Kamelion
 Nicola Bryant as Peri Brown
 Colin Baker as the Sixth Doctor

The Doctor 
Peter Davison makes his final regular appearance as the Doctor in The Caves of Androzani. Colin Baker makes his first full appearance as the Doctor in the final serial The Twin Dilemma.

Companions 
Janet Fielding (Tegan Jovanka) and Mark Strickson (Vislor Turlough) continue their roles as the Fifth Doctor's companions for their final season, Janet Fielding leaves in Resurrection of the Daleks and Mark Strickson departs in Planet of Fire. New companion Peri Brown played by Nicola Bryant makes her first appearance in Planet of Fire.

The shape-shifting Android Companion Kamelion, played by Gerald Flood, makes his second and final appearance in Planet of Fire, though the character itself – along with other Fifth Doctor companions who left by this story (Tegan, Nyssa, Adric, and Turlough) – all make illusionary cameos as the Doctor regenerates at the climax of The Caves of Androzani.

Recurring actors 
 Anthony Ainley as The Master

Anthony Ainley returns in Planet of Fire as the Master, which was intended to be his final appearance. Ainley, like other departed fifth Doctor companions make illusionary cameos as the Doctor regenerates.

Guest stars
Davros makes his first appearance since Destiny of the Daleks (1979) this time played by Terry Molloy.

Serials 

Episodes were broadcast twice weekly on Thursday and Friday evenings, with Resurrection of the Daleks broadcast on two consecutive Wednesday nights.

Resurrection of the Daleks was planned as a standard four-parter. However, the BBC's coverage of the 1984 Winter Olympics meant that Doctor Who'''s normal timeslot was unavailable. Rather than delay broadcasting the story, the decision was taken to produce it as a pair of double length episodes and broadcast it in the unfamiliar Wednesday timeslot.The Caves of Androzani was the first time since Season 4's The Tenth Planet that the introduction of a new Doctor had taken place before the final serial of the season.

Production

During this season, the title card was slightly modified for the final serial The Twin Dilemma, and continued during Colin Baker's reign as the Sixth Doctor until the end of the season 23 14 episode epic The Trial of a Time Lord.

Broadcast
The entire season was broadcast from 5 January to 30 March 1984. Transmission moved to Thursdays and Fridays, except for Resurrection of the Daleks'' which was aired in two double-length episodes on Wednesdays.

Home media

VHS releases

DVD and Blu-ray releases

In print

References

Bibliography

 

1984 British television seasons
Season 21
Season 21
21
21